Global Command and Control System (GCCS) is the United States' armed forces DoD joint command and control (C2) system used to provide accurate, complete, and timely information for the operational chain of command for U.S. armed forces.  "GCCS" is most often used to refer to the computer system, but actually consists of hardware, software, common procedures, appropriation, and numerous applications and interfaces that make up an "operational architecture" that provides worldwide connectivity with all levels of command.  GCCS incorporates systems that provide situational awareness, support for intelligence, force planning, readiness assessment, and deployment applications that battlefield commanders require to effectively plan and execute joint military operations.

History

GCCS evolved from earlier predecessors such as TBMCS (Theater Battle Management Core Systems), Joint Operations Tactical System (JOTS), and Joint Maritime Command Information System (JMCIS) to fulfill a requirement for technological, procedural, and security improvements to the aging Worldwide Military Command and Control System, aka WWMCCS, and its TEMPEST requirements of Cold War defense from wiretapping and electromagnetic signal interceptions, to include physical (special wire and cabinet shielding, double locks) and operational (special access passes and passwords) measures.  On August 30, 1996, the Defense Information Systems Agency (DISA) officially decommissioned WWMCCS and the Joint Staff declared the Global Command and Control System (GCCS) as the joint command and control system of record.

Applications, Functionality
GCCS systems comprise various data processing and web services which are used by many applications supporting combat operations, troop/force movements (JOPES), intelligence analysis and production, targeting, ground weapons and radar analysis, and terrain and weather analysis. Some next-generation applications designed for GCCS may support collaboration using chat systems, newsgroups, and email. (See JOPES, Mob/ODEE, etc.)

GCCS supports six mission areas (operations, mobilization, deployment, employment, sustainment, and intelligence) through eight functional areas:  threat identification and assessment, strategy planning aids, course of action development, execution planning, implementation, monitoring, risk analysis, and a common tactical picture.

Connectivity
GCCS may use NIPRNet, SIPRNet, JWICS, or other IP based networks for connectivity. In some installations, GCCS aggregates over 94 different sources of data.

Components/Variants
 GCCS-A Army
 GCCS-AF Air Force
 GCCS-I Intelligence
 GCCS-J  Marine Corps, Joint Forces
 GCCS-M (Maritime) (Navy, Coast Guard)
The Navy's life cycle development of what is currently referred to as the Global Command and Control System, was and continues to be evolutionary in nature and will probably never result in a permanent system.  From the early 1980s when SPAWARs PD-40 VADM Jerry O. Tuttle's Joint Operations Tactical System was the premier system, through the tenure of VADM John Gauss's Joint Maritime Command Information System (JMCIS), the final product would be realized as the Global Command and Control System (GCCS), introduced conceptually by the Defense Information Systems Agency (DISA).

See also
Worldwide Military Command and Control System

References 

Military communications
Military equipment of the United States
Military globalization
Command and control
Command and control systems of the United States military